Věra Čáslavská (3 May 1942 – 30 August 2016) was a Czechoslovak artistic gymnast and Czech sports official. She won a total of 22 international titles between 1959 and 1968 including seven Olympic gold medals, four world titles and eleven European championships. Čáslavská is the most decorated Czech gymnast in history and is one of only two female gymnasts, along with Soviet Larisa Latynina, to win the all-around gold medal at two consecutive Olympics. She remains the only gymnast, male or female, to have won an Olympic gold medal in each individual event.

In addition to her gymnastics success, Čáslavská was known for her outspoken support of the Czechoslovak democratization movement and her opposition to the 1968 Soviet-led invasion of Czechoslovakia. At the 1968 Olympics in Mexico City, she took this protest to the world stage by quietly looking down and away while the Soviet national anthem was played during the medal ceremonies for the balance beam and floor exercise event finals. While Čáslavská's actions were applauded by her compatriots, they resulted in her becoming a persona non grata in the new regime. She was forced into retirement and for many years was denied the right to travel, work and attend sporting events.

Čáslavská's situation improved in the 1980s after the intervention of members of the International Olympic Committee, and following the Velvet Revolution her status improved dramatically. During the 1990s she held several positions of honor, including a term as president of the Czech Olympic Committee.

Gymnastics career

Born in Prague and originally a figure skater, Čáslavská debuted internationally in 1958 at the World Artistic Gymnastics Championships, winning a silver medal in the team event. Her first international title came the following year at the European Women's Artistic Gymnastics Championships where she won gold on the vault and silver on the balance beam. She first participated in the 1960 Summer Olympic Games, winning a silver medal with the Czechoslovak team, and then won bronze in the all around event at the 1961 European Championships. She fought for the all-around title at home in the 1962 World Championships, held off only by Larisa Latynina, and managed to win her first world title, in the vault. She did not compete at the 1963 European Championships in Paris.

Between 1964 and 1968 Čáslavská won 19 individual gold medals in major international competitions. She was at her peak at the 1964 Summer Olympics in Tokyo, winning the overall title and taking gold medals in the balance beam and the vault, in addition to another silver medal in the team event. At the 1966 World Championships, Čáslavská defended her vault title, winning a team gold – breaking the Soviet monopoly in that event – and became all-around world champion. Čáslavská dominated the 1965 and 1967 European Championships, taking all five individual titles and scoring perfect scores of 10 in 1967.

Prior to the 1968 Summer Olympics in Mexico City, Čáslavská lost her training facility due to the Soviet-led invasion of Czechoslovakia. Instead, she used potato sacks as weights and logs as beams whilst training in the forests of Moravia. She was again dominant at the 1968 Summer Olympics, winning medals in all six events. She defended her all-around title and won additional gold medals on the floor, uneven bars and vault, as well as two silvers, for the team competition and balance beam. As of the 2020 Olympic Games in Tokyo, she and Larisa Latynina are the only gymnasts to win the gold medal in individual all-around in consecutive Olympic games as well as the only female gymnast to defend her gold medal in the vault apparatus. Her use of the "Jarabe tapatío" as the music for her floor routine and her subsequent marriage in the city made her immensely popular with the Mexican crowd.

Protest at the 1968 Olympics
Čáslavská's wins at the 1968 Olympics were particularly poignant because of the political turmoil in Czechoslovakia. She had publicly voiced her strong opposition to Soviet-style Communism and the Soviet invasion, and had signed Ludvik Vaculík's protest manifesto "Two Thousand Words" in the spring of 1968. Consequently, to avoid being arrested, she spent the weeks leading up to the Olympics hiding in the mountain town of Šumperk, and was only granted permission to travel to Mexico City at the last minute.

At the Olympics, where she once again faced Soviet opposition, Čáslavská continued to subtly voice her views. After she appeared to have won the gold medal on floor outright, the judging panel curiously upgraded the preliminary scores of Soviet Larisa Petrik, and declared a tie for the gold instead. All of this occurred on the heels of another very controversial judging decision that cost Čáslavská the gold on beam, instead awarding the title to Soviet rival Natalia Kuchinskaya. Clearly disheartened and angered by the politics that favored the USSR, she protested during both medal ceremonies by quietly turning her head down and away during the playing of the Soviet national anthem.

Later career
Čáslavská was revered by Czech people for her brave demonstration on the world's biggest stage, and she was awarded Czechoslovakia's  Sportsperson of the Year award in 1968 (for the fourth and final time). Her federation, however, was none too pleased. For her consistent support of the Czechoslovak democratization movement (the so-called "Prague Spring") in 1968, and during the purges which followed the Soviet-led invasion in August 1968, she was deprived of the right to travel abroad and participate in public sport events both in Czechoslovakia and abroad. Čáslavská was effectively forced into retirement, and was considered a persona non grata for many years in her home country.

Czechoslovak authorities refused to publish her autobiography, and insisted that it be heavily censored when it was released in Japan. She was granted leave to work as a coach in Mexico, but reportedly only when the Mexican government threatened to cease oil exports to Czechoslovakia. In the late 1980s, following pressure from Juan Antonio Samaranch, the then president of the International Olympic Committee, who had presented her with the Olympic Order, Čáslavská was finally allowed to work as a gymnastics coach and judge in her home country.

After the fall of Communism, the Velvet Revolution in November 1989, Čáslavská's status improved dramatically. She became President Havel's adviser on sports and social matters and Honorary President of the Czech-Japan Association. Later, after leaving the President's Office, she was elected President of the Czech Olympic Committee. In 1995, she was appointed to the IOC membership committee.

Eponymous skill
Čáslavská has one eponymous skill listed in the Code of Points.

Honours
Čáslavská received numerous accolades for her contributions to the sport of gymnastics. In addition to the Olympic Order, she was awarded a 1989 Pierre de Coubertin International Fair Play Trophy by UNESCO and was noted at the ceremony for her "exemplary dignity". In 1995, she was honored with the Czech Republic's Medal of Merit. She was inducted into the International Women's Sports Hall of Fame in 1991 and the International Gymnastics Hall of Fame in 1998. In 2010, she was awarded the Order of the Rising Sun, 3rd class. She was also presented a 17th-century katana and a ceremonial kimono from the Japanese emperor.

In 2014, she was the joint recipient (with AP journalist Iva Drapalova) of the Hanno R. Ellenbogen Citizenship Award, awarded annually by the Prague Society for International Cooperation and Global Panel Foundation, for outstanding civic courage.

An inner main belt asteroid (26986) Caslavska is named for her.

Personal life and death

Shortly before the end of the 1968 Olympics, Čáslavská married runner Josef Odložil, who had been a silver medalist at the 1964 Olympics in Tokyo. The ceremony, which took place at the Mexico City Cathedral, drew a crowd of thousands. They had a daughter, Radka, and a son, Martin. The couple divorced in 1987. In 1993, her son and ex-husband were involved in an altercation with Martin allegedly punching Josef; he fell to the floor and struck his head, leading to his death. Čáslavská became depressed and was rarely seen in public afterwards. Čáslavská eventually overcame her depression (which she had been fighting for about 15 years), and returned to both social and sports lives, coaching younger gymnasts.

Čáslavská was diagnosed with pancreatic cancer in 2015. Her health deteriorated significantly in the summer of 2016, to such an extent that she was taken to a hospital in Prague on 30 August, where she died at the age of 74.

Competition history

See also
 List of top Olympic gymnastics medalists
 List of top medalists at the World Artistic Gymnastics Championships

References

External links

 
 
 
 

1942 births
2016 deaths
Czechoslovak female artistic gymnasts
Gymnasts at the 1960 Summer Olympics
Gymnasts at the 1964 Summer Olympics
Gymnasts at the 1968 Summer Olympics
Olympic gymnasts of Czechoslovakia
Medalists at the 1960 Summer Olympics
Medalists at the 1964 Summer Olympics
Medalists at the 1968 Summer Olympics
Olympic medalists in gymnastics
Olympic gold medalists for Czechoslovakia
Olympic silver medalists for Czechoslovakia
World champion gymnasts
European champions in gymnastics
Medalists at the World Artistic Gymnastics Championships
International Olympic Committee members
Recipients of Medal of Merit (Czech Republic)
Czech sports executives and administrators
Gymnasts from Prague
Deaths from pancreatic cancer
Deaths from cancer in the Czech Republic
Originators of elements in artistic gymnastics